Frederick Smith (26 November 1898 – 1971) was an English footballer who played at full back for Bury in the Football League in the 1920s and 1930s. He also played non-league football for Rossendale United, Ashton National and Hurst.

References

1898 births
1971 deaths
People from Waterfoot, Lancashire
English footballers
Association football fullbacks
Rossendale United F.C. players
Bury F.C. players
Ashton National F.C. players
Ashton United F.C. players
English Football League players
Date of death missing